Frank Bissell may refer to:
Frank Bissell (American football) (1902–1983)
Frank Bissell (politician) (1878–1970), American politician from Iowa
Frank S. Bissell, American wrestler